The Lepidoptera of Puerto Rico consist of both the butterflies and moths recorded from the island of Puerto Rico.

According to a recent estimate, there are about 1000 Lepidoptera species present in Puerto Rico.

Butterflies

Hesperiidae
Achlyodes thraso sagra Evans, 1953
Astraptes anaphus anausis (Godman & Salvin, 1896)
Astraptes talus (Cramer, 1777)
Atalopedes mesogramma apa Comstock, 1944
Calpodes ethlius (Stoll, 1782)
Choranthus borinconus (Watson, 1937)
Choranthus haitensis Skinner, 1920
Choranthus vitellius (Fabricius, 1793)
Cymaenes tripunctus tripunctus (Herrich-Shaffer, 1865)
Epargyreus zestos (Geyer, 1832)
Ephyriades arcas philemon (Fabricius, 1775)
Ephyriades zephodes (Hübner, 1825)
Euphyes singularis insolata (Butler, 1878)
Gesta gesta gesta Herrich-Schäffer, 1863
Hylephila phileus phileus (Drury, 1773)
Nyctelius nyctelius nyctelius (Latreille, 1823)
Panoquina nero belli Watson, 1937
Panoquina ocola (Edwards, 1863)
Panoquina panoquinoides panoquinoides (Skinner, 1892)
Panoquina sylvicola woodruffi Watson, 1937
Perichares philetes philetes (Gmeling, 1790)
Phocides pigmalion bicolora (Boddaert, 1783)
Polites vibex dictynna (Godman & Salvin, 1896)
Polygonus leo savigny (Latreille, 1824)
Proteides mercurius pedro (Dewitz, 1877)
Pyrgus oileus oileus (Linnaeus, 1767)
Pyrrchocalles antigua antigua (Herrich-Shaffer, 1863)
Urbanus dorantes cramptoni Comstock, 1944
Urbanus proteus domingo (Scudder, 1872)
Wallengrenia druryi druryi (Latreille, 1824)

Lycaenidae
Allosmaitia fidena (Hewitson, 1867)
Chlorostrymon maesites maesites (Herrich-Shaeffer, 1864)
Chlorostrymon simaethis simaethis (Drury, 1770)
Echinargus isola isola (Reakirt, 1866)
Electrostrymon angelia boyeri (Comstock & Huntington, 1943)
Hemiargus hanno watsoni Comstock & Huntington, 1943
Hemiargus thomasi noelli Comstock & Huntington, 1943
Hemiargus woodruffi Comstock & Huntington, 1943
Leptotes cassius theonus (Lucas, 1857)
Nesiostrymon celida aibonito (Comstock & Huntington, 1943)
Pseudochrysops bornoi (Comstock & Huntington, 1943)
Strumon limenia (Hewitson, 1868)
Strymon acis mars (Fabricius, 1777)
Strymon bubastus pence (Comstock & Huntington, 1943)
Strymon columella arecibo (Comstock & Huntington, 1943)

Nymphalidae
Adelpha arecosa (Hewitson, 1847)
Anaea troglodyte borinquenalis Johnson & Comstock, 1941
Anartia jatrophae semifusca Munroe, 1942
Antillea pelops pelops (Drury, 1770)
Asterocampa lycaon idyja (Geyer, 1828)
Atlantea tulita (Dewitz, 1877)
Biblis hyperia hyperia (Cramer, 1779)
Calisto nubila Lathy, 1899
Colobura dirce wolcotti Comstock, 1942
Danaus eresimus eresimus (Cramer, 1777)
Danaus gilippus cleothera (Godart, 1820)
Danaus plexippus plexippus (Linnaeus, 1758)
Danaus plexippus portoricensis (Clark, 1941)
Dione vanillae insularis (Maynard, 1889)
Dryas iulia iulia (Fabricius, 1775)
Eunica monima (Stoll, 1782)
Eunica tatila tatilista Kaye, 1926
Euptoieta claudia claudia (Cramer, 1775)
Euptoieta hegesia watsoni Comstock, 1944
Hamadryas ferox diasia (Fruhstorfer, 1916)
Heliconius charitonius charitonius (Linnaeus, 1767)
Heliconius melphis melphis Godart, 1819
Helioconius charitonius punctatus (Hall, 1936)
Hipolinmas misippus (Linnaeus, 1764)
Historis acheronta cadmus (Cramer, 1775)
Historis odius odius (Fabricius, 1775)
Hypanartia paullus (Fabricius, 1793)
Libytheana terena (Godart, 1819)
Lycorea ceres cleobaea (Godart, 1820)
Marpesia chiron (Fabricius, 1775)
Marpesia petreus thetys (Fabricius, 1777)
Precis evarete michaelesi Munroe, 1951
Prepona amphitoe amphitoe (Godart, 1823)
Siderone nemesis (Illiger, 1801)
Siproeta stelenes stelenes (Linnaeus, 1758)
Vanessa cardui cardui (Linnaeus, 1758)
Vanessa virginiensis (Drury, 1770)

Papilionidae
Battus polydamas thyamus (Rothschild & Jordan, 1906)
Papilio aristodemus aristodemus Esper, 1794
Papilio androgeus epidaurus Godman & Salvin, 1890
Papilio pelaus imerius Godart, 1819

Pieridae
Anteos maerula maerula (Fabricius, 1775)
Aphrissa godartiana (Swainson, 1821)
Aphrissa statira cubana d'Almeida, 1939
Appias drusilla boydi Comstock, 1943
Appias punctifera d'Almeida. 1939
Ascia josephina krugii (Dewitz, 1877)
Ascia monuste eubotea (Godart, 1819)
Dismorphia spio (Latreille, 1819)
Eurema daira palmira (Poey, 1851)
Eurema elathea elathea (Cramer, 1777)
Eurema leuce sanjuanensis Watson, 1938
Eurema lisa euterpe (Ménétriés, 1832)
Eurema nicippe (Cramer), 1779
Eurema portoricensis (Dewitz, 1877)
Kricogonia castalia (Fabricius, 1793)
Phoebis agarithe antillia Brown, 1929
Phoebis argante martini Comstock, 1944
Phoebis philea philea (Johanson, 1763)
Phoebis sennae sennae (Linnaeus, 1758)
Phoebis trite watsoni Brown, 1929

Moths

Nepticulidae
Stigmella gossypii Forbes & Leonard, 1930

Tischeriidae
Astrotischeria heliopsisella Chambers, 1875

Tineidae
Antipolistes anthracella Forbes, 1933
Erechthias minuscula (Walsingham, 1897)
Ereunetis aeneoalbida Walsingham, 1897
Ereunetis particolor Walsingham
Eudarcia argyrophaea (Forbes, 1931)
Eudarcia tischeriella (Walsingham, 1897)
Haplotinea insectella (Fabricius, 1794)
Infurcitinea luteella Forbes, 1931
Infurcitinea palpella Forbes, 1931
Lepyrotica brevistrigata Walsingham, 1897
Mea incudella Forbes, 1931
Mea yunquella Forbes, 1931
Niditinea fuscella (Linnaeus, 1758)
Protodarcia plumella (Walsingham, 1892)
Taeniodictys sericella Forbes, 1933
Tinea familiaris Zeller, 1877
Tinea minutella (Fabricius, 1794)
Tinea pallidorsella (Zeller, 1877)
Tinea scythropiella Walsingham, 1897
Tineola walsinghami Busck, 1933
Tiquadra aeneonivella (Walker, 1864)
Urodus mirella Möschler, 1890
Xystrologa antipathetica (Forbes, 1931)

Acrolophidae
Acrolophus arcanella (Clemens, 1859)
Acrolophus harpasen Forbes, 1931
Acrolophus ochracea (Möschler, 1890)
Acrolophus plumifrontella (Clemens, 1859)
Acrolophus triatomellus Walsingham, 1897
Acrolophus triformellus Forbes, 1930
Acrolophus vitellus Poey, 1832
Acrolophus walsinghami Möschler, 1890

Psychidae
Cryptothelea nigrita (Barnes & McDunnough, 1913)
Oiketicus kirbyi Guilding, 1827

Lyonetiidae
Leucoptera coffeella (Guérin-Méneville, 1842)

Gracilariidae
Acrocercops albomarginatum (Walsingham, 1897)
Acrocercops cymella Forbes, 1931
Acrocercops inconspicua Forbes, 1930
Acrocercops pontifica Forbes, 1931
Acrocercops zebrulella Forbes, 1931
Caloptilia aeneocapitella (Walsingham, 1891)
Dialectica rendalli (Walsingham, 1897)
Dialectica sanctaecrucis (Walsingham, 1897)
Eucosmorpha dives Walsingham, 1897
Phyllocnistis citrella Stainton, 1856
Spanioptila spinosum Walsingham, 1897

Ethmiidae
Ethmia joviella Walsingham, 1897
Ethmia kirbyi Möschler, 1890
Ethmia nivosella (Walker, 1864)

Alucitidae
Alucita montana Barnes & Lindsey, 1921
Orneodes eudactyla (Felder & Rogenhofer, 1877)

Blastobasidae
Auximobasis constans Walsingham, 1897
Auximobasis insularis Walsingham, 1897
Auximobasis variolata Walsingham, 1897
Blastobasis subolivacea Walsingham, 1897

Coleophoridae
Pammeces picticornis Walsingham, 1897
Coleophora pulchricornis Walsingham, 1897

Batrachedridae
Homaledra sabalella (Chambers, 1880)

Cosmopterygidae
Aphanosara planistes Forbes, 1931
Batrachedra albistrigella Möschler, 1890
Cosmopterix astrapias Walsingham, 1909
Cosmopterix attenuatella (Walker, 1864)
Cosmopterix carpo Koster, 2010
Cosmopterix gemmiferella Clemens, 1860
Cosmopterix interfracta Meyrick, 1922
Cosmopterix similis Walsingham, 1897
Cosmopterix vanderwolfi Koster, 2010
Ithome curvipunctella (Walsingham, 1892)
Ithome fuscula Forbes, 1931
Ithome pernigrella (Forbes, 1931)
Pebobs ipomoeae (Busck, 1900)
Pebobs sanctivincenti (Walsingham, 1892)
Perimede annulata Busck, 1914
Perimede purpurescens Forbes, 1931
Pyroderces stigmatophora (Walsingham, 1897)
Stilbosis phaeoptera Forbes, 1931
Triclonella mediocris (Walsingham, 1897)

Oecophoridae
Agonopterix argillacea (Walsingham, 1881)
Mothonica ocellea Forbes, 1930

Gelechiidae

Anomologinae
Monochroa absconditella (Walker, 1864)

Gelechiinae
Agnippe evippeella Busck, 1906
Aristotelia diolcella Forbes, 1931
Aristotelia lignicolora Forbes, 1931
Aristotelia penicillata (Walsingham, 1897)
Aristotelia vagabundella Forbes, 1931
Chionodes salva (Meyrick, 1925)
Gelechia exclarella Möschler, 1890
Keiferia gudmannella (Walsingham, 1897)
Nicanthes rhodoclea Meyrick, 1928
Phthorimaea operculella (Zeller, 1873)
Polyhymno luteostrigella Chambers, 1874
Recurvaria annulicornis (Walsingham, 1897)
Recurvaria eromene (Walsingham, 1897)
Recurvaria kittella (Walsingham, 1897)
Stegasta bosquella (Chambers, 1875)
Stegasta capitella (Fabricius, 1794)
Symmetrischema striatella (Murtfeldt, 1900)
Telphusa distictella Forbes, 1931
Telphusa perspicua (Walsingham, 1911)

Anacampsinae
Anacampsis insularis Walsingham, 1897
Anacampsis mangelivora Walsingham, 1897
Anacampsis meibomiella Forbes, 1931
Anacampsis melanophaea Forbes, 1931
Anacampsis picticornis Walsingham, 1897
Compsolechia plumbeolata (Walsingham, 1897)
Pectinophora gossypiella (Saunders, 1844)
Sitotroga cerealella (Olivier, 1789)

Dichomeridinae
Brachyacma palpigera (Walsingham, 1891)
Commatica bifuscella (Forbes, 1931)
Dichomeris acuminata (Staudinger, 1876)
Dichomeris indigna (Walsingham, 1892)
Dichomeris manella (Möschler, 1890)
Dichomeris melissia Walsingham, 1911
Dichomeris pectinella (Forbes, 1931)
Dichomeris piperata (Walsingham, 1892)
Empedaula rhodocosma (Meyrick, 1914)
Eunebristis zingarella (Walsingham, 1897)
Glaucacna iridea Forbes, 1931
Oecia oecophila (Staudinger, 1876)
Onebala elliptica (Forbes, 1931)
Thiotricha sciurella (Walsingham, 1897)

Glyphipterygidae
Brenthia elongata Heppner, 1985
Brenthia hibiscusae Heppner, 1985
Tortyra aurofasciana (Snellen, 1875)

Yponomeutidae
Euarne obligatella Möschler, 1890
Plutella xylostella (Linnaeus, 1758)
Urodus sordidata Zeller, 1877
Yponomeuta triangularis (Möschler, 1890)

Heliodinidae
Heliodines quinqueguttata Walsingham, 1897

Cossidae
Psychonoctua personalis Grote, 1865

Schistonoeidae
Schistonoea fulvidella (Walsingham, 1897)

Elachistidae
Ethmia abraxasella (Walker, 1864)
Ethmia confusella (Walker, 1863)
Ethmia notatella (Walker, 1863)

Tortricidae

Chlidanotinae
Ardeutica patillae Razowski & Becker, 2011

Olethreutinae
Ancylis virididorsana (Möschler, 1890)
Bactra priapeia (Heinrich, 1923)
Bactra verutana Zeller, 1875
Cacocharis canofascia Forbes, 1930
Crocidosema calvifrons Walsingham, 1891
Crocidosema longipalpana (Möschler, 1891)
Crocidosema plebejana Zeller, 1847
Crocidosema unica Heinrich, 1923
Cydia albimaculana (Fernald, 1879)
Cydia fahlbergiana Thunberg, 1797
Dichrorampha excitana (Möschler, 1890)
Endothenia hebesana (Walker, 1863)
Epiblema strenuana (Walker, 1863)
Episimus argutana (Clemens, 1860)
Ethelgoda texanana (Walsingham, 1879)
Eucosma autochthones (Walsingham, 1897)
Gymnandrosoma aurantianum Lima, 1927
Gymnandrosoma desotanum (Heinrich, 1926)
Gymnandrosoma trachycerus Forbes, 1931
Olethreutes anthracana Forbes, 1931
Strepsicrates smithiana Walsingham, 1891

Tortricinae
Aethesoides distigmatana Walsingham, 1897
Amorbia effoetana Möschler, 1891
Apinoglossa comburana Möschler, 1891
Apotoforma rotundipennis (Walsingham, 1897)
Cochylis bunteoides Forbes, 1931
Cochylis parallelana Walsingham, 1879
Cochylis prolectana Möschler, 1891
Cochylis tectonicana Möschler, 1891
Cochylis vicinitana Möschler, 1891
Coelostathma discopunctana Clemens, 1860
Drachmobola insignitana Möschler, 1891
Ewunia gemella Razowski & Becker, 2002
Lasiothyris puertoricana Razowski & Becker, 2007
Lorita lepidulana Forbes, 1931
Maricaona maricaonana Razowski & Becker, 2007
Platphalonidia subolivacea Walsingham, 1897
Platynota flavedana Clemens, 1860
Platynota rostrana (Walker, 1863)
Saphenista multistrigata Walsingham, 1914
Saphenista semistrigata Forbes, 1931

Megalopygidae
Megalopyge krugii Dewitz, 1877

Crambidae

Acentropinae
Neargyractis moniligeralis Lederer, 1863
Neargyractis plusialis (Herrich-Schäffer, 1871)
Parapoynx fluctuosalis (Zeller, 1852)
Petrophila doriscalis (Schaus, 1940)
Petrophila opulentalis (Lederer, 1863)
Petrophila sumptuosalis (Möschler, 1890)

Crambinae
Argyria diplomachalis Schaus, 1940
Argyria lacteella (Fabricius, 1794)
Cliniodes euphrosinalis Möschler, 1886
Cliniodes semilunalis Möschler, 1890
Crambus discludellus (Möschler, 1890)
Crambus moeschleralis Schaus, 1940
Crambus quinquareatus Zeller, 1877
Cyclocena lelex (Cramer, 1777)
Diatraea saccharalis (Fabricius, 1794)
Fissicrambus fissiradiellus (Walker, 1863)
Fissicrambus minuellus (Walker, 1863)
Fissicrambus profanellus (Walker, 1866)
Microcrambus biguttellus (Forbes, 1920)
Microcrambus discludellus (Möschler, 1890)
Microcrambus elegans (Clemens, 1860)
Microcausta flavipunctalis Barnes & McDunnough, 1913
Parapediasia ligonella (Zeller, 1881)
Urola nivalis (Drury, 1773)

Evergestinae
Alatuncusia bergii (Möschler, 1891)
Chalcoela pegasalis (Walker, 1859)
Chrysendeton bromachalis (Schaus, 1940)
Chrysendeton medicinalis (Grote, 1881)
Chrysendeton miralis (Möschler, 1890)
Dichogama amabilis Möschler, 1891
Dichogama colotha Dyar, 1912
Dichogama fernaldi Möschler, 1889
Dichogama gudmanni Hedemann
Dichogama innocua (Fabricius, 1793)
Dichogama jessicales Schaus, 1940
Dichogama redtenbacheri Lederer, 1863
Dicymolomia metalophota (Hampson, 1897)
Evergestella evincalis Möschler, 1890
Hellula phidilealis (Walker, 1859)
Microtheoris ophionalis (Walker, 1859)
Mimoschinia rufofascialis (Stephens, 1834)
Mimoschinia thalialis (Walker, 1859)
Trischistognatha palindialis (Guenée, 1854)
Trischistognatha pyrenealis (Walker, 1859)

Glaphyriinae
Aethiophysa savoralis (Schaus, 1920)
Glaphyria badierana (Fabricius, 1794)
Glaphyria dolatalis Möschler, 1890
Lipocosma hebescalis Möschler, 1890
Schacontia themis Solis & Goldstein, 2013

Musotiminae
Neurophyseta mineolalis (Schaus, 1940)
Odilla noralis Schaus, 1940
Undulambia species

Pyraustinae
Achyra bifidalis (Fabricius, 1794)
Achyra nudalis (Hübner, 1796)
Achyra rantalis (Guenée, 1854)
Achyra similalis (Guenée, 1854)
Agathodes designalis Guenée, 1854
Apilocrosis pimalis (Barnes & Benjamin, 1926)
Apogeshna infirmalis (Möschler, 1886)
Apogeshna stenialis (Guenée, 1854)
Araschnopsis subulalis (Guenée, 1854)
Asciodes denticulinea (Schaus, 1940)
Asciodes gordialis Guenée, 1854
Ategumia ebulealis (Guenée, 1854)
Atomopteryx pterophoralis (Walker, 1866)
Atomopteryx serpentifera (Hampson, 1913)
Azochis euvexalis Möschler, 1890
Azochis rufidiscalis Hampson, 1904
Bicilia iarchasalis (Walker, 1859)
Blepharomastix aguirrealis (Schaus, 1940)
Blepharomastix differentialis (Dyar, 1914)
Blepharomastix ranalis (Guenée, 1854)
Conchylodes concinnalis Hampson, 1898
Conchylodes diptheralis (Geyer, 1832)
Condylorrhiza oculatalis (Möschler, 1890)
Condylorrhiza vestigialis (Guenée, 1854)
Crocidocnemis pellucidalis Möschler, 1890
Cryptobotys zoilusalis (Walker, 1859)
Desmia ceresalis Walker, 1859
Desmia naclialis Snellen
Desmia ploralis (Guenée, 1854)
Desmia recurvalis Schaus, 1940
Desmia stenizonalis Hampson, 1912
Desmia tages (Cramer, 1777)
Desmia ufeus (Cramer, 1777)
Diacme elealis (Walker, 1859)
Diacme mopsalis (Walker, 1859)
Diaphania costata (Fabricius, 1775)
Diaphania elegans Möschler, 1890
Diaphania fuscicaudalis (Möschler, 1881)
Diaphania hyalinata (Linnaeus, 1767)
Diaphania immaculalis (Guenée, 1854)
Diaphania infernalis Möschler, 1890
Diaphania infimalis (Guenée, 1854)
Diaphania lucidalis (Hübner, 1823)
Diaphania nitidalis (Stoll, 1781)
Diaphantania ceresalis (Walker, 1859)
Diasemiopsis leodocusalis (Walker, 1859)
Diasemiopsis ramburialis (Duponchel, 1833)
Diathrausta yunquealis Schaus, 1940
Epicorsia oedipodalis (Guenée, 1854)
Epipagis algarrobolis (Schaus, 1940)
Ercta vittata (Fabricius, 1794)
Eulepte anticostalis (Grote, 1871)
Eulepte concordalis Hübner, 1825
Eulepte inguinalis (Guenée, 1854)
Glyphodes sibillalis Walker, 1859
Herpetogramma bipunctalis (Fabricius, 1794)
Herpetogramma fluctuosalis (Lederer, 1863)
Herpetogramma infuscalis (Guenée, 1854)
Herpetogramma phaeopteralis (Guenée, 1854)
Hileithia ductalis Möschler, 1890
Hoterodes ausonia (Cramer, 1779)
Hymenia perspectalis (Hübner, 1796)
Isocentris amoenalis (Walker)
Lamprosema memoralis Schaus, 1940
Lineodes gracilalis (Herrich-Schäffer, 1871)
Lineodes metagrammalis Möschler, 1890
Lineodes triangulalis Möschler, 1890
Loxomorpha cambogialis (Guenée, 1854)
Loxomorpha flavidissimalis (Grote, 1878)
Lygropia imparalis (Walker)
Lygropia joasharia Schaus, 1940
Lygropia joelalis Schaus, 1940
Lygropia tripunctata (Fabricius, 1794)
Marasmia cochrusalis (Walker, 1859)
Marasmia trapezalis (Guenée, 1854)
Maruca testulalis (Geyer, 1832)
Maruca vitrata (Fabricius, 1787)
Microphysetica hermeasalis (Walker, 1859)
Microthyris anormalis (Guenée, 1854)
Microthyris prolongalis (Guenée, 1854)
Neoleucinodes prophetica (Dyar, 1914)
Neoleucinodes torvis Capps, 1948
Oenobotys glirialis (Herrich-Schäffer, 1871)
Oenobotys vinotinctalis (Hampson, 1895)
Omiodes humeralis Guenée, 1854
Omiodes indicata (Fabricius, 1775)
Omiodes martyralis (Lederer, 1863)
Omiodes simialis Guenée, 1854
Ommatospila narcaeusalis (Walker, 1859)
Palpita flegia (Cramer, 1777)
Palpita isoscelalis (Guenée, 1854)
Palpita quadristigmalis (Guenée, 1854)
Pantographa limata (Grote & Robinson, 1867)
Penestola bufalis (Guenée, 1854)
Phaedropsis placendalis (Möschler, 1890)
Phaedropsis principaloides (Möschler, 1890)
Phostria originalis Lederer
Pilocrocis hesperialis (Herrich-Schäffer)
Pilocrocis ramentalis Lederer, 1863
Pleuroptya silicalis (Guenée, 1854)
Polygrammodes elevata (Fabricius, 1794)
Portentomorpha xanthialis (Guenée, 1854)
Psara dryalis (Walker, 1859)
Psara obscuralis (Lederer, 1863)
Psara pertentalis Möschler, 1890
Pseudopyrausta acutangulalis (Snellen, 1875)
Pyrausta cardinalis (Guenée, 1854)
Pyrausta cerata (Fabricius)
Pyrausta episcopalis (Herrich-Schäffer)
Pyrausta gentillalis Schaus, 1940
Pyrausta gracilalis (Herrich-Schäffer)
Pyrausta illutalis (Möschler)
Pyrausta insignitalis (Guenée, 1854)
Pyrausta laresalis Schaus, 1940
Pyrausta phoenicealis (Walker, 1859)
Pyrausta phyllidalis Schaus, 1940
Pyrausta tyralis (Guenée, 1854)
Pyrausta votanalis Schaus, 1940
Rhectocraspeda periusalis (Walker, 1859)
Salbia cassidalis Guenée, 1854
Salbia cognatalis (Snellen, 1875)
Salbia haemorrhoidalis Guenée, 1854
Salbia varanalis Schaus, 1940
Samea carettalis Schaus, 1940
Samea conjunctalis Möschler, 1890
Samea ecclesialis Guenée, 1854
Samea mictalis Hampson, 1912
Samea multuplicalis (Guenée, 1854)
Sathria internitalis (Guenée, 1854)
Sathria onophasalis (Walker, 1859)
Sisyracera inabsconsalis (Möschler, 1890)
Sisyracera contortilinealis (Hampson, 1895)
Spoladea recurvalis (Fabricius, 1794)
Steniodes declivalis (Dyar. 1914)
Syllepis marialis Poey, 1832
Syllepte belialis (Walker, 1859)
Syllepte imbroglialis Dyar, 1914
Syllepte patagialis Zeller, 1852
Synclera jarbusalis Walker, 1859)
Synclera traducalis (Zeller, 1852)
Syngamia florella (Stoll, 1781)
Terastia meticulosalis Guenée, 1854
Triuncidia eupalusalis (Walker, 1859)
Udea albipunctalis Dognin, 1905
Udea rubigalis (Guenée, 1854)
Udea secernalis (Möschler, 1890)
Uresiphita reversalis (Guenée, 1854)

Schoenobiinae
Rupela leucatea (Zeller, 1863)

Scopariinae
Elusia enalis Schaus, 1940

Spilomelinae
Arthromastix lauralis (Walker, 1859)
Asturodes fimbriauralis (Guenée, 1854)
Bradina hemmingalis Schaus, 1940
Ceratoclasis delimitalis (Guenée, 1854)
Prenesta quadrifenestralis (Herrich-Schäffer)
Pycnarmon receptalis (Walker, 1859)
Sparagmia gigantalis Guenée, 1854
Sparagmia gonoptera Guenée, 1854
Sufetula sacchari (Seín, 1930)
Trichaea flammeolalis (Möschler, 1890)

Pyralidae

Chrysauginae
Bonchis munitalis (Lederer, 1863)
Caphys bilineata (Stoll, 1781)
Carcha hersilialis Walker, 1859
Epitamyra albomaculalis Möschler, 1890
Murgisca subductellus (Möschler, 1890)
Parachma ochracealis Walker, 1866
Salobrena recurvata (Möschler, 1886)
Streptopalpia minusculalis (Möschler, 1890)

Epipaschiinae
Deuterollyta majuscula Herrich-Schäffer, 1871
Jocara ragonoti (Möschler, 1890)
Macalla thyrsisalis Walker, 1859
Phidotricha insularella (Ragonot, 1889)
Pococera scabridella (Ragonot, 1899)
Stericta alnotha (incertae sedis) Schaus, 1922
Tallula atramentalis (Lederer, 1863)

Galleriinae
Achroia grisella (Fabricius, 1794)
Corcyra cephalonia (Stainton, 1866)
Galleria mellonella (Linnaeus, 1758)
Pogrima palmasalis Schaus, 1940

Phycitinae
Anabasis ochrodesma (Zeller, 1881)
Apomyelois decolor (Zeller, 1881)
Apomyelois muriscis Dyar, 1914
Cactoblastis cactorum (Berg, 1885)
Cadra cautella (Walker, 1863)
Caristanius pellucidella (Ragonot, 1889)
Chararica bicolorella (Barnes & McDunnough, 1917)
Crocidomera fissuralis (Walker, 1863)
Crocidomera turbidella (Zeller, 1848)
Davara rufulella (Ragonot, 1889)
Ectomyelois ceratoniae (Zeller, 1839)
Elasmopalpus lignosellus (Zeller, 1848)
Etiella zinckenella (Treitschke, 1832)
Fundella pellucens Zeller, 1848
Genopaschia protomis Dyar, 1914
Homalopalpia dalera Dyar, 1914
Hypsipyla grandella (Zeller, 1848)
Laetilia portoricensis Dyar, 1915
Myelois furvidorsella Ragonot
Nonia exiguella (Ragonot, 1888)
Oncolabis anticella Zeller, 1848
Plodia interpunctella (Hübner, 1813)
Salebria famula (Zeller, 1881)
Sarasota furculella (Dyar, 1919)
Ufa rubedinella (Zeller, 1848)
Unadilla maturella (Zeller, 1881)

Pyralinae
Hypsopygia nostralis (Guenée, 1854)
Micromastra isoldalis Schaus, 1940
Ocrasa nostralis Guenée, 1854
Pyralis manihotalis Guenée, 1854

Limacodidae
Heuretes picticornis Grote & Robinson, 1868

Thyrididae
Banisia myrsusalis (Walker, 1859)
Rhodoneura species
Zeuzerodes maculata Warren, 1907

Hyblaeidae
Hyblaea puera (Cramer, 1777)

Pterophoridae
Adaina bipunctatus Möschler, 1890
Adaina ipomoeae Bigot & Etienne, 2009
Adaina participata Möschler, 1890
Adaina praeusta Möschler, 1890
Exelastis pumilio (Zeller, 1873)
Geina integumentum Gielis, 2006
Geina periscelidactylus (Fitch, 1854)
Hellinsia inquinatus (Zeller, 1873)
Hellinsia paleaceus (Zeller, 1873)
Hellinsia unicolor (Barnes & McDunnough, 1913)
Lantanophaga pusillidactylus (Walker, 1864)
Lioptilodes albistriolatus (Zeller, 1871)
Megalorrhipida leucodactylus (Fabricius, 1794)
Michaelophorus hodgesi Gielis, 1999
Michaelophorus margaritae Gielis, 2006
Ochyrotica fasciata Walsingham, 1891
Postplatyptilia caribica Gielis, 2006
Sphenarches caffer (Zeller, 1852)
Stenoptilodes brevipennis (Zeller, 1874)

Geometridae

Alsophilinae
Almodes terraria Guenée, [1858]
Ametris nitrocris (Cramer, 1780)

Ennominae
Boarmia hilararia (Möschler, 1890)
Cyclomia mopsaria Guenée, 1857
Drepanodes infensata Guenée, 1857
Epimecis hortaria (Fabricius, 1794)
Erastria decrepitaria (Hübner, [1823])
Hydatoscia ategua Druce, 1982
Iridopsis delicata (Butler, 1878)
Iridopsis idonearia (Walker, 1860)
Leuciris mysteriotis Prout, 1911
Leucula simplicaria Guenée, 1858
Macaria aemulataria Walker, 1861
Macaria diffusata Walker, 1861
Melanochroia chephise (Cramer, 1782)
Moschleria hulstii Möschler, 1890
Nepheloleuca complicata (Guenée, 1858)
Nepheloleuca illiturata (Guenée, 1898)
Nepheloleuca politia (Cramer, 1777)
Numia terebintharia Guenée, [1858]
Oxydia vesulia (Cramer, [1779])
Patalene ephyrata (Guenée, [1858])
Patalene olyzonaria (Walker, 1860)
Patalene epionata (Guenée, [1858])
Pero nerisaria (Walker, 1860)
Pero rectisectaria (Herrich-Schäffer, [1855])
Phrygionis auriferaria (Hulst, 1887)
Phrygionis moeschleri Prout, 1933
Phrygionis paradoxata (Guenée, [1858])
Psamatodes abydata (Guenée, 1855)
Psamatodes everiata (Guenée, [1858])
Psamatodes nicetaria (Guenée, 1858)
Psamatodes trientata (Herrich-Schäffer, 1870)
Sabulodes aegrotata (Guenée, [1858])
Sabulodes caberata Guenée, 1858
Sabulodes exhonorata Guenée, 1858
Semiothisa cellulata (Herrich-Schäffer, 1890)
Semiothisa increta (Walker, 1861)
Semiothisa paleolata (Guenée, 1858)
Semiothisa regulata (Fabricius, 1775)
Sericoptera virginaria (Hulst, 1886)
Serraca momaria (Guenée, 1857)
Sphacelodes vulneraria (Hübner, 1823)
Thyrinteina arnobia (Stoll, 1782)
Thysanopyga amarantha Debauche, 1937
Thysanopyga apicitruncaria Herrich-Schäffer, [1856]

Geometrinae
Chloropteryx paularia (Möschler, 1886)
Hydata insatisfacta Herbulot, 1988
Oospila confundaria Möschler, 1890
Phrudocentra centrifugaria (Herrich-Schäffer, 1870)
Racheospila isolata Warren, 1900
Racheospila merlinaria Schaus, 1940
Racheospila sanctaecrucis Prout, 1932
Synchlora cupedinaria (Grote, 1880)
Synchlora frondaria Guenée, [1858]
Synchlora xysteraria (Hulst, 1886)
Synchlora gerularia (Hübner, [1823])
Synchlora herbaria (Fabricius, 1794)

Larentiinae
Cidaria chloronotata Möschler, 1890
Disclisioprocta stellata (Guenée, [1858])
Eois snellenaria Möschler, 1892
Euphyia moeraria (Guenée, 1858)
Euphyia perturbata (Walker, 1862)
Euphyia vinaceata Möschler, 1890
Eupithecia satyrata (Hübner, [1813])
Graphidipus aureocapitaria (Möschler, 1890)
Obila praecurraria (Möschler, 1890)
Pterocypha defensata Walker, 1862

Sterrhinae
Acratodes intamiataria Möschler, 1890
Acratodes oslinaria Schaus, 1940
Acratodes praepeditaria Möschler, 1890
Acratodes virgota (Schaus, 1901)
Idaea curvicauda Schaus, 1940
Idaea fernaria (Schaus, 1940)
Idaea monata (Forbes, [1947])
Idaea placitaria Schaus, 1940
Leptostales crossii (Hulst, 1900)
Leptostales oblinataria (Möschler, 1890)
Leptostales pannaria (Guenée, [1858])
Leptostales phorcaria (Guenée, [1858])
Lobocleta dativaria Schaus, 1940
Lobocleta maricaria Schaus, 1940
Lobocleta monogrammata (Guenée, [1858])
Lobocleta mutuataria (Möschler, 1890)
Lobocleta perditaria (Walker, 1866)
Lobocleta tenellata (Möschler, 1886)
Pleuroprucha asthenaria (Walker, 1861)
Pleuroprucha molitaria Möschler, 1890
Pleuroprucha pyrrhularia Möschler, 1890
Pleuroprucha yunkearia Schaus, 1940
Pseudasellodes fenestraria (Guenée, 1858)
Ptychamalia perlata Warren, 1900)
Scelolophia delectabilaria (Möschler, 1890)
Scelolophia randaria Schaus, 1940
Scelolophia terminata (Guenée, 1858)
Scopula canularia (Herrich-Schäffer, 1870)
Scopula innominata Schaus, 1940
Scopula laresaria Schaus, 1940
Scopula subquadrata (Guenée, [1858])
Scopula umbilicata (Fabricius, 1794)
Semaeopus caecaria (Hübner, [1823])
Semaeopus malefidaria (Möschler, 1890)
Semaeopus perletaria Möschler, 1890
Tricentrogyna floridora Schaus, 1940
Tricentrogyna vinacea (Butler, 1878)

Epiplemidae
Epiplema ecludaria Möschler, 1890
Epiplema ineptaria Möschler, 1890
Epiplema obvallataria Möschler, 1890
Letchena myrsusalis Walker
Nedusia excavata Möschler, 1890
Syngria ramosaria Möschler, 1890
Syngria reticularia Möschler, 1890
Trotorhombia metachromata (Walker, 1861)

Sphingidae
Aellopos blaini Herrich-Schäffer, [1869]
Aellopos fadus (Cramer, 1776)
Aellopos tantalus (Linnaeus, 1758)
Aellopos titan (Cramer, 1777)
Agrius cingulata (Fabricius, 1775)
Cautethia noctuiformis (Walker, 1856)
Ceratomia catalpae (Boisduval, 1875)
Cocytius antaeus (Drury, 1773)
Enyo lugubris (Linnaeus, 1771)
Erinnyis alope (Drury, 1770)
Erinnyis crameri (Schaus, 1898)
Erinnyis ello (Linnaeus, 1758)
Erinnyis lassauxii (Boisduval, 1859)
Erinnyis obscura (Fabricius, 1775)
Erinnyis oenotrus (Cramer, 1782)
Eumorpha fasciatus (Sulzer, 1776)
Eumorpha labruscae (Linnaeus, 1758)
Eumorpha vitis (Linnaeus, 1758)
Hyles lineata (Fabricius, 1775)
Isognathus rimosa (Grote, 1865)
Madoryx oiclus (Cramer, [1780])
Manduca brontes (Drury, 1773)
Manduca florestan (Cramer, 1782)
Manduca rustica (Fabricius, 1775)
Manduca sexta (Linnaeus, 1763)
Neococytius cluentius (Cramer, 1776)
Pachylia ficus (Linnaeus, 1758)
Perigonia lusca (Fabricius, 1777)
Protambulyx strigilis (Linnaeus, 1771)
Pseudosphinx tetrio (Linnaeus, 1771)
Xylophanes chiron (Drury, 1771)
Xylophanes pluto (Fabricius, 1777)
Xylophanes tersa (Linnaeus, 1771)

Notodontidae
Dasychira plagiata (Walker, 1865)
Heterocampa guttivitta (Walker, 1855)
Hippia insularis (Grote, 1866)
Notela jaliscana Schaus, 1901
Nystalea aequipars (Walker, 1858)
Nystalea ebalea (Stoll, [1780])
Nystalea nyseus (Cramer, [1775])
Nystalea superciliosa (Guenée, 1852)
Rifargia distinguenda (Walker, 1856)

Erebidae

Herminiinae
Bleptina acastusalis Walker, [1859]
Bleptina araealis (Hampson, 1901)
Bleptina caradrinalis Guenée, 1854
Bleptina hydrillalis Guenée, 1854
Bleptina menalcasalis Walker, [1859]
Carteris oculatalis (Möschler, 1890)
Hypena vetustalis Guenée, 1854
Hypenula cacuminalis (Walker, 1859)
Hypenula complectalis (Guenée, 1854)
Kyneria utuadae Schaus, 1940
Lascoria alucitalis (Guenée, 1854)
Lascoria orneodalis (Guenée, 1854)
Lophophora clanymoides Möschler, 1890
Mastigophorus demissalis Möschler, 1890
Mastigophorus jamaicalis Schaus, 1916
Palthis asopialis (Guenée, 1854)
Phlyctaina irrigualis Möschler, 1890
Physula albipunctilla Schaus, 1916
Physula peckii Möschler, 1890
Tetanolita floridana (Smith, 1895)
Tetanolita mutatalis (Möschler, 1890)

Hypeninae
Hypena umbralis (Smith, 1884)
Hypena minualis Guenée, 1854
Hypena conditalis Möschler, 1890
Hypena degasalis Walker, 1859
Hypena exoletalis (Guenée, 1854)
Hypena lividalis (Hübner, 1796)
Hypena porrectalis (Fabricius, 1794)
Lophoditta tuberculata (Herrich-Schäffer, 1870)

Rivulinae
Rivula pusilla Möschler, 1890

Phytometrinae
Aglaonice hirtipalpis (Walker, [1859])
Cecharismena cara Möschler, 1890
Cecharismena nectarea Möschler, 1890
Glympis concors (Hübner, 1823)
Glympis eubolialis (Walker, [1866])
Hormoschista latipalpis (Walker, 1858)
Mursa subrufa (Warren, 1889)
Ommatochila mundula (Zeller, 1872)
Radara nealcesalis (Walker, 1859)

Calpinae
Adiopa disgrega (Möschler, 1890)
Eudocima serpentinfera (Walker, [1858])
Gonodonta aequalis (Walker, 1857)
Gonodonta bidens Geyer, 1832
Gonodonta clotilda (Stoll, [1790])
Gonodonta incurva (Sepp, [1840])
Gonodonta nitidimacula Guenée, 1852
Gonodonta sicheas (Cramer, [1777])
Gonodonta uxoria (Cramer, 1780)
Graphigona regina (Guenée, 1852)
Hemicephalis characteria (Stoll, [1790])
Hemicephalis krugii Möschler, 1890
Oraesia excitans Walker, [1858]
Parachabora abydas (Herrich-Schäffer, [1869])
Pararcte schneideriana (Stoll, 1782)
Plusiodonta thomae Guenée, 1852
Pseudyrias watsoni Schaus, 1940

Hypenodinae
Schrankia macula (Druce, 1891)

Scoliopteryginae
Alabama argillacea (Hübner, 1823)
Anomis editrix (Guenée, 1852)
Anomis erosa Hübner, 1821
Anomis flava (Fabricius, 1775)
Anomis gundlachi Schaus, 1940
Anomis illita (Guenée, 1852)
Anomis impasta Guenée, 1852

Eulepidotinae
Antiblemma andersoni Schaus, 1940
Antiblemma anhypha (Guenée)
Antiblemma concinnula (Walker, 1865)
Antiblemma prisca Möschler, 1890
Antiblemma rufinans (Guenée, 1852)
Antiblemma sterope (Stoll, 1780)
Anticarsia elegantula (Herrich-Schäffer, 1869)
Anticarsia gemmatalis Hübner, 1818
Azeta repugnalis (Hübner, 1825)
Ephyrodes cacata Guenée, 1852
Epitausa coppryi (Guenée, 1852)
Eulepidotis addens (Walker, 1858)
Eulepidotis hebe (Möschler, 1890)
Eulepidotis juncida (Guenée, 1852)
Eulepidotis merricki (Holland, 1902)
Eulepidotis micca (Druce, 1889)
Eulepidotis modestula (Herrich-Schäffer, 1869)
Eulepidotis superior (Guenée, 1852)
Litoprosopus hatuey (Poey, 1832)
Manbuta pyraliformis (Walker, 1858)
Massala obvertens (Walker, 1858)
Metallata absumens (Walker, 1862)
Phyprosopus fastigiata (Herrich-Schäffer, 1868)
Renodes aequalis (Walker, 1865)
Syllectra congemmalis Hübner, 1823
Syllectra erycata (Cramer, [1780])
Syllectra lucifer Möschler, 1890

Anobinae
Baniana relapsa (Walker, 1858)

Erebinae
Achaea ablunaris (Guenée, 1852)
Ascalapha odorata (Linnaeus, 1758)
Bendis bayamona Schaus, 1940
Bendis gurda Guenée
Bendis magdalia Guenée, 1852
Dyomyx inferior (Herrich-Schäffer, [1869])
Epidromia pannosa Guenée, 1852
Epidromia rotundata (Herrich-Schäffer, 1869)
Hemeroblemma rengus (Poey, 1832)
Kakopoda progenies (Guenée, 1852)
Latebraria amphipyroides Guenée, 1852
Lesmone formularis (Geyer, 1837)
Letis mycerina Cramer, 1777
Melipotis acontioides (Guenée, 1852)
Melipotis contorta (Guenée, 1852)
Melipotis famelica (Guenée, 1852)
Melipotis fasciolaris (Hübner, 1823)
Melipotis guanicana Schaus, 1940
Melipotis indomita (Walker, [1858])
Melipotis januaris (Guenée, 1852)
Melipotis ochrodes (Guenée, 1852)
Melipotis perpendicularis (Guenée, 1852)
Mimophisma forbesi Schaus, 1940
Mocis antillesia Hampson, 1913
Mocis disseverans (Walker, 1858)
Mocis latipes (Guenée, 1852)
Mocis marcida (Guenée, 1852)
Mocis megas (Guenée, 1852)
Mocis repanda (Fabricius, 1794)
Ophisma tropicalis Guenée, 1852
Peosina numeria (Drury, 1770)
Perasia garnoti (Guenée, 1852)
Perasia helvina (Guenée)
Ptichodis immunis (Guenée, 1852)
Safia acharia Stoll, 1781
Selenisa suero (Cramer, 1779)
Selenisa sueroides (Guenée, 1852)
Thysania zenobia (Cramer, [1777])
Toxonprucha diffundens (Walker, 1858)
Zale exhausta (Guenée, 1852)
Zale fictilis (Guenée, 1852)
Zale setipes (Guenée, 1852)
Zale strigimacula (Guenée, 1852)

Eublemminae
Eublemma basalis (Möschler, 1890)
Eublemma cinnamomea (Herrich-Schäffer, 1868)
Eublemma minima (Guenée, 1852)
Eublemma recta (Guenée, 1852)
Eublemma sydolia Schaus, 1940

Arctiinae
Agylla sericea (Druce, 1885)
Calidota strigosa (Walker, 1855)
Composia credula (Fabricius, 1775)
Correbidia terminalis (Walker, 1856)
Cosmosoma achemon (Fabricius, 1781)
Cosmosoma auge (Linnaeus, 1767)
Ctenuchidia virginalis Forbes, 1930
Ctenuchidia virgo (Herrich-Schäffer, [1855])
Empyreuma pugione (Linnaeus, 1767)
Eunomia rubripunctata (Butler, 1876)
Eupseudosoma involuta (Sepp, 1849)
Halysidota cinctipes Grote, 1865
Horama panthalon (Fabricius, 1793)
Horama pretus (Cramer, [1777])
Hyalurga vinosa (Drury, [1773])
Hypercompe decora (Walker, 1855)
Hypercompe icasia (Cramer, [1777])
Hypercompe scribonia (Stoll, 1790)
Lomuna nigripuncta Hampson, 1900
Lymire flavicollis (Dewitz)
Mulona species
Nyridela chalciope (Hübner, [1831])
Opharus bimaculata (Dewitz, 1877)
Paramulona albulata (Herrich-Schäffer, 1866)
Pareuchaetes insulata (Walker, 1855)
Phoenicoprocta capistrata (Fabricius, 1775)
Phoenicoprocta partheni (Fabricius, 1793)
Progona pallida (Möschler, 1890)
Trocodima hemiceras (Forbes, 1931)
Utetheisa ornatrix (Linnaeus, 1758)

Euteliidae
Eutelia ablatrix (Guenée, 1852)
Eutelia furcata (Walker, 1865)
Eutelia pyrastis Hampson, 1905
Paectes arcigera (Guenée, 1852)
Paectes devincta (Walker, 1858)
Paectes lunodes (Guenée, 1852)
Paectes obrotunda (Guenée, 1852)

Nolidae
Afrida ydatodes Dyar, 1913
Casandria ferrocana (Walker, 1857)
Cephalospargeta elongata Möschler, 1890
Collomena filifera (Walker, 1857)
Concana mundissima Walker, [1858]
Garella nilotica (Rogenhofer, 1881)
Iscadia aperta Walker, 1857
Motya abseuzalis Walker, 1859
Mouralia tinctoides (Guenée, 1852)
Nola bistriga (Möschler, 1890)
Nola cereella (Bosc, [1800])
Nola minna Butler, 1881
Nola portoricensis Möschler, 1890
Nola sinuata Forbes, 1930
Stictoptera vitrea Guenée, 1852

Noctuidae

Plusiinae
Agrapha calceolaris (Walker, [1858])
Argyrogramma verruca (Fabricius, 1794)
Autoplusia egena (Guenée, 1852)
Chrysodeixis includens (Walker, [1858])
Enigmogramma admonens (Walker, [1858])
Enigmogramma antillea Becker, 2001
Notioplusia illustrata (Guenée, 1852)
Trichoplusia ni (Hübner, [1803])

Bagisarinae
Amyna axis (Guenée, 1852)
Amyna bullula (Grote, 1873)
Bagisara buxea (Grote, 1881)
Bagisara repanda (Fabricius, 1793)

Cydosiinae
Cydosia nobilitella (Cramer, [1780])

Eustrotiinae
Cobubatha albipectus Möschler, 1890
Cobubatha metaspilaris (Walker, 1863)
Cobubatha putnami Möschler, 1890
Marimatha botyoides (Guenée, 1852)
Marimatha nigrofimbria (Guenée, 1852)
Marimatha operta (Möschler, 1890)
Marimatha portoricensis (Möschler, 1890)
Marimatha tripuncta (Möschler, 1890)
Ozarba cinda Schaus, 1940
Tripudia coamona (Schaus, 1940)
Tripudia luxuriosa Smith, 1900
Tripudia rectangula Pogue, 2009

Acontiinae
Anateinoma affabilis Möschler, 1890
Chobata discalis Walker, [1858]
Haplostola aphelioides Möschler, 1890
Ponometia exigua (Fabricius, 1793)
Spragueia dama (Guenée, 1852)
Spragueia margana (Fabricius, 1794)
Spragueia pantherula (Herrich-Schäffer, 1868)
Spragueia perstructana (Walker, 1865)
Tarachidia flavibasis Hampson, 1898
Tarachidia mixta (Möschler, 1890)

Diphtherinae
Diphthera festiva (Fabricius, 1775)

Acronictinae
Agriopodes jucundella Dyar, 1922

Amphipyrinae
Cropia infusa (Walker, [1858])
Metaponpneumata rogenhoferi Möschler, 1890

Oncocnemidinae
Catabenoides vitrina (Walker, 1857)
Neogalea sunia (Guenée, 1852)

Agaristinae
Caularis undulans Walker, [1858]
Micrathetis triplex (Walker, 1857)
Neotuerta sabulosa (Felder, 1874)

Condicinae
Condica albigera (Guenée, 1852)
Condica circuita (Guenée, 1852)
Condica concisa (Walker, 1856)
Condica cupentia (Cramer, [1799])
Condica mobilis (Walker, [1857])
Condica selenosa Guenée, 1852
Condica sutor (Guenee, 1852)
Homophoberia apicosa (Haworth, 1809)

Heliothinae
Helicoverpa armigera (Hübner, [1805])
Helicoverpa zea (Boddie, 1850)
Heliothis virescens (Fabricius, 1777)

Eriopinae
Callopistria floridensis (Guenée, 1852)
Callopistria jamaicensis (Möschler, 1886)

Noctuinae
Acroria terens (Walker, 1857)
Agrotis apicalis Herrich-Schäffer, 1868
Agrotis malefida Guenée, 1852
Anicla infecta (Ochsenheimer, 1816)
Bryolymnia huastea Schaus, 1940
Cobaliodes tripunctus Hübner
Dypterygia punctirena (Walker, 1857)
Elaphria agrotina (Guenée, 1852)
Elaphria andersoni Schaus, 1940
Elaphria arnoides (Herrich-Schäffer, [1869])
Elaphria chalcedonia (Hübner, 1803)
Elaphria deltoides (Möschler, 1880)
Elaphria nucicolora (Guenée, 1852)
Elaphria promiscua Möschler, 1880
Elaphria subobliqua (Walker, 1858)
Eriopyga adjuntasa Schaus, 1940
Feltia repleta (Walker, 1857)
Feltia subterranea (Fabricius, 1794)
Galgula partita Guenée, 1852
Gonodes liquida (Möschler, 1886)
Hadena ligata Möschler, 1880
Heterochroma berylloides Hampson, 1908
Lacinipolia parvula (Herrich-Schäffer, 1868)
Leucania chejela (Schaus, 1921)
Leucania hampsoni Schaus, 1940
Leucania humidicola Guenée, 1852
Leucania inconspicua Herrich-Schäffer, 1868
Leucania latiuscula (Herrich-Schäffer, 1868)
Leucania microsticha (Hampson, 1905)
Leucania phragmitidicola Guenée, 1852
Magusa orbifera (Walker, 1857)
Meliana rosea (Möschler)
Mythimna unipuncta (Haworth, 1809)
Sesamia calamistis (Hampson, 1910)
Speocropia scriptura (Walker, 1858)
Spodoptera albula (Walker, 1857)
Spodoptera androgea (Stoll, [1781])
Spodoptera dolichos (Fabricius, 1794)
Spodoptera eridania (Stoll, [1781])
Spodoptera frugiperda (J.E. Smith, 1797)
Spodoptera latifascia (Walker, 1856)
Spodoptera ornithogalli (Guenée, 1852)
Spodoptera pulchella (Herrich-Schäffer, 1868)
Tandilia rodea (Schaus, 1894)
Xanthopastis timais (Cramer, [1780])

References

A Preliminary Checklist of the Moths of Puerto Rico
Checklist of the Butterflies of Puerto Rico (Lepidoptera, Rhopalocera, West Indies)

 Lepid
Lepidoptera

Puerto Rico
Puerto Rico
Puerto Rico